The 2004–05 A Group was the 57th season of the top Bulgarian national football league (commonly referred to as A Group) and the 81st edition of a Bulgarian national championship tournament.

Overview
It was contested by 16 teams, and CSKA Sofia won the championship.

Teams

Promotion and Relegation
The league was contested by 16 teams, 13 returning from the previous season, as well as three teams promoted from the B Group. The promoted teams are Beroe Stara Zagora, Pirin Blagoevgrad, and Nesebar. Beroe return after a two-year absence, Pirin return after a four-year absence, while Nesebar made their debut in the top level of Bulgarian football.

Stadiums and Locations

League table

Results

Champions
CSKA Sofia

Charras, Ayanda, Sakaliev and Manolov left the club during a season.

Top scorers

References

External links
Bulgaria - List of final tables (RSSSF)
2004–05 Statistics of A Group at a-pfg.com

First Professional Football League (Bulgaria) seasons
Bulgaria
1